A total solar eclipse will occur on December 5, 2048. A solar eclipse occurs when the Moon passes between Earth and the Sun, thereby totally or partly obscuring the image of the Sun for a viewer on Earth. A total solar eclipse occurs when the Moon's apparent diameter is larger than the Sun's, blocking all direct sunlight, turning day into darkness. Totality occurs in a narrow path across Earth's surface, with the partial solar eclipse visible over a surrounding region thousands of kilometres wide.

Related eclipses

Solar eclipses of 2047–2050

Saros 133

Metonic series 
 All eclipses in this table occur at the Moon's ascending node.

References

External links 

2048 12 5
2048 12 5
2048 in science